Rosy Varte (22 November 1923 – 14 January 2012) was a French actress of Armenian descent. She made more than 100 film and television appearances during her career. 

She starred in the 1972 film The Bar at the Crossing, which was entered into the 22nd Berlin International Film Festival. She was a voice actress in the cartoon Western movies, Daisy Town (1971, as "Lulu Carabine") and La Ballade des Dalton (1978, as "Miss Worthlesspenny").

Life and career
Born Nevarte Manouelian in Istanbul, Turkey, she emigrated to France at an early age. She appeared in comedies. From 1985 to 1993, she had the title role (Maguy Boissier) in 333 episodes of the hit TV series Maguy. In 2007, she won the 7 d'Or award for Best Actress for playing Maguy Boissier.

Death
She died 14 January 2012 at the American Hospital in Neuilly-sur-Seine, aged 88, following a battle with bronchitis, which degenerated into a lung infection, according to her widower, director Pierre Badel.

Partial filmography

 Manon (1949) - Minor Role
 Vendetta in Camargue (1950) - Conchita
 Three Women (1952) - Paméla
 Open Letter (1953) - La concierge - Madame Pépin
 Minuit... Quai de Bercy (1953) - Mme Boulay, l'épicière
 Virgile (1953) - La grande Léa
 Les hommes ne pensent qu'à ça (1954) - Dolorès - la victime du dragueur
 Casse-cou, mademoiselle! (1955) - La collègue
 French Cancan (1955) - Habituée du café (uncredited)
 Gueule d'ange (1955) - Mathilde
 Les Hussards (1955) - Juliette (uncredited)
 Les Assassins du dimanche (1956) - Marie Simonet
 Pardonnez nos offenses (1956)
 En légitime défense (1958) - Rita
 Le petit prof (1959) - Mme. Léa
 The Gigolo (1960) - Marilyn
 Fortunat (1960) - Rosette Falk
 Le Tracassin or Les Plaisirs de la ville (1961) - La patronne
 La Vendetta (1962) - Mme Lauriston
 Love at Twenty (1962) - La mère de Colette (segment "Antoine et Colette")
 Antoine and Colette (1962, Short) - Colette's Mother
 Angélique, Marquise des Anges (1964) - Rosalba Neri (voice)
 Male Companion (1964) - La mère d'Isabelle / Isabelle's Mother
 Marvelous Angelique (1965) - Rosalba Neri (voice)
 Thomas the Impostor (1965) - Madame Valiche
 The Sultans (1966) - Girl in the club
 Trois enfants... dans le désordre (1966) - Mme Duchemin
 Le voyage du père (1966) - La barmaid du bistrot 'La Patrie'
 Salut Berthe! (1968) - Berthe Chautard
 La honte de la famille (1969) - Perrine Hadol
 Mon oncle Benjamin (1969) - Bettine Machecourt
 Le pistonné (1970) - Madame Langmann - la mère
 Daisy Town (1971) - Lulu Carabine (voice)
 Le Viager (1972) - Elvire Galipeau
 The Bar at the Crossing (1972) - Maria
 La belle affaire (1973) - Therese
 La grande nouba (1974) - La vicomtesse
 Peur sur la ville (1975) - Germaine Doizon
 La Ballade des Dalton (1978) - Miss Worthlesspenny (voice)
 Love on the Run (1979) - La mère de Colette
 T'inquiète pas, ça se soigne (1980) - Infirmière Rose Carlin
 Le bourgeois gentilhomme (1982) - Madame Jourdain
 Le braconnier de Dieu (1983) - La première musicienne en voiture
 Rock 'n Torah (1983) - Esther, la mère d'Isaac
 Waiter! (1983) - Gloria
 Happy Easter (1984) - Marlène Chataigneau, la mère de Julie
 Monsieur de Pourceaugnac (1985) - Nérine
 Chère canaille (1992) - Daisy

References

External links

1923 births
2012 deaths
French film actresses
French television actresses
Actresses from Istanbul
Turkish people of Armenian descent
Turkish emigrants to France
French people of Armenian descent
Deaths from lung disease
Infectious disease deaths in France
French people of Turkish descent
20th-century French actresses
French voice actresses